Akbar Khan may refer to the following in South Asia:

History and politics
 Akbar, Mughal emperor, Abu'l-Fath Jalal ud-din Muhammad (Akbar)
 Wazir Akbar Khan (1816-1845), Afghan Prince, general and a tribal leader involved in the first Anglo-Afghan War
 Akbar Khan (Pakistani general) (1912-1993), planned the first Indo-Pakistani war of 1947
 Akbar Ayub Khan (born 1971), Pakistani politician
 Nawab Akbar Khan Bugti, chief of Bugti tribe and former Governor of Balochistan province
 Muhammed Akbar Khan, first native Muslim general in British Indian Army
 Muhammad Akbar Khan (politician), member of the Punjab Province (British India) legislative council

Culture and science
 Akbar Khan (director), Indian film director, producer, writer, actor and brother of Feroz Khan, Sanjay Khan & Sameer Khan
 Ali Akbar Khan (1922–2009), Indian classical musician
 Akbar Ali Khan (economist), Bangladeshi economist and educationist

Other persons
 Akbar Khan (disability activist) (born 1962), recipient of India's National Award for The Welfare of Persons with Disability in 1989

Places
 Akbar Khan Mehwa, a village and former princely (e)state, part of Pantlavdi, in Pandu, Rewa Kantha, Gujarat